Nautilus, Inc., located in Vancouver, Washington, United States, is the American worldwide marketer, developer, and manufacturer of fitness equipment brands Bowflex, Modern Movement, Nautilus, Schwinn Fitness, and Universal. The products are sold globally to customers through a combination of television commercials/infomercials, the Internet, call centers and retail stores.

Organization
Nautilus, Inc. is the maker of fitness equipment brands Bowflex, Modern Movement, Nautilus, Octane Fitness, Schwinn Fitness and Universal Gym Equipment, sold globally directly to customers through a combination of television commercials, infomercials, response mailings, the Internet, inbound/outbound call centers and retail stores.

James “Jim” Barr IV, a former OfficeMax and Microsoft executive, was named CEO in July 2019.

In 2015, the company opened a new building across from its headquarters in Vancouver, Washington, United States to expand its development and research team, and to house the company's only retail location – The Nautilus Shop.

The company also has offices in China and Rotterdam, and distribution centers in Portland, Oregon and Columbus, Ohio.

Brian Cook, held the CEO position for 17 years, from to 1986 to 2003 when he was replaced by Gregg Hammann. who resigned in August 2007 after sales fell to $134 million from $159.6 million in 2006.

In 2007, after Hammann's departure, Robert S. Falcone, the former Nike chief financial officer, became the Nautilus, Inc. interim chief executive officer, where he also served as president and chairman since October 17, 2007. In April 2008, Falcone was replaced by Edward Bramson, a major stock owner. Under Bramson's leadership, the company changed sales focus to solely direct-to-customer and retail businesses, which resulted in the sale of its StairMaster brand. Bramson was CEO and chairman of Nautilus, Inc. until May 2011, when he announced he would be stepping down and Bruce M. Cazenave, former executive with Black and Decker and Timberland, would be the new CEO.

History
Nautilus, Inc. originated in 1986 with the sale of most of the company by the inventor of  Nautilus machines, Arthur Jones.  Jones created the Nautilus machine, then called the Blue Monster, in the late 1960s, with the purpose of developing a fitness machine that accommodates human movement. The company's name was changed to Nautilus because the logarithmic-spiral cam, which made the machine a success, resembled a nautilus.

Bowflex acquired Nautilus, Inc. and specialized in designing, developing and marketing strength and cardio fitness products. In 1997, the company changed its name to Direct Focus and acquired the Nautilus, Schwinn and StairMaster brands between 1999 and 2002, before changing its name to Nautilus, Inc. Nautilus became a publicly traded company in May 1999.

The company stopped selling exercise equipment to gyms in 2011 and shifted its focus to home-use equipment. The same year, Nautilus, Inc. licensed its brand name and technology to other manufacturers.

In 2004, Nautilus, Inc. was sued by Biosig Instruments for allegedly infringing its design for heart-rate monitors. The case eventually reached the United States Supreme Court, who used it to establish reasonable certainty as the standard for judging whether or not a patent claim is indefinite.

Nautilus, Inc. acquired Octane Fitness, LLC from private equity firm North Castle Partners on December 31, 2015.

The company was recognized by The Oregonian as one of the top places to work, as well as the company with the healthiest employees of Oregon by the Portland Business Journal, in its 100-499 employee category.

Nautilus, Inc. has been an American Heart Association Fit-Friendly company since 2010. The company is recognized for its Road to Wellness Program, which challenges and rewards employees to get healthier.

Finance
From 2011 to 2017, the company's cash position increased from $17 million to $85 million.

As a result of its three-year profit, revenue and stock growth, Nautilus, Inc. was No. 23 on Fortune's 100 Fastest Growing Companies list in 2015.

On March 18, 2014, Bruce Cazenave, CEO of Nautilus, Inc., rang the New York Stock Exchange's opening bell. Nautilus, Inc. also featured its new home fitness cardio machine, the Bowflex Max Trainer machine, on the NYSE trading floor and discussed the company's 2013 fourth quarter and full year financial growth.

In 2013, Nautilus, Inc. posted $218.8 million in revenue, a 13% increase over 2012. The company's financial performance in the past two years has led to Nautilus, Inc. landing at No. 4 on The Seattle Times’ 23rd annual ranking of publicly traded companies based in the Northwest.

Since 2012, the company's stock has increased to more than $14 a share.

Brands and products 
The Nautilus, Inc. portfolio includes global fitness equipment brands Bowflex, Nautilus, Modern Movement, Octane Fitness, Schwinn and Universal.

Bowflex

Bowflex is the brand name for a series of fitness training equipment. The first Bowflex product, Bowflex 2000X home gym, was created in 1986. Bowflex products now range from cardio machines, to adjustable dumbbells  and home gyms. The Bowflex brand includes the Bowflex Max Trainer and Bowflex TreadClimber machines, the SelectTech Adjustable dumbbells for strength training, and Bowflex Xtreme 2 home gym and Bowflex Revolution home gym.

The brand also makes treadmills and elliptical machines.

Schwinn

The Schwinn brand includes cardio products such as the Schwinn Airdyne bike, designed to challenge users’ entire body by increasing wind resistance the harder they pedal. The Schwinn Airdyne Pro bike model received the 2016 Good Design Award  from the European Centre for Architecture Art Design and Urban Studies. The brand also includes Schwinn ellipticals and Schwinn stationary bikes.

In addition to upright and indoor cycling bikes, the Schwinn brand also includes treadmills  and rowing machines, as well as the vintage styled Schwinn Classic Cruiser  bike with a digital app.

Nautilus
Created in the 1970s, the Nautilus brand developed the variable-resistance cable machine. The Nautilus brand sells through direct, e-commerce, retail and international channels and includes cardio products such as ellipticals, treadmills, and bikes.

The Nautilus E618  elliptical cardio machine is made from tubular steel for strength and durability. The E618 elliptical also includes a LCD display, which tracks users' progress and heart rate. The brand also includes Nautilus T618 treadmill   which comes with 26 workout programs.

Universal

Founded in 1957, the Universal Gym Equipment brand is known for its strength equipment. In 2006, it was acquired by Nautilus, Inc.

Octane Fitness
Founded in 2001 by Dennis Lee and Tim Porth, Octane Fitness is a cardio equipment manufacturer specializing in elliptical machines for home and commercial use. Nautilus, Inc. acquired the Octane Fitness brand in December 2015 and integrated operations into the existing corporate structure.

Octane Fitness cardio machines include elliptical machines such as the Octane Fitness Q37 standing elliptical machine, xRide recumbent machine, Octane Fitness LateralX lateral cross training machine. In 2014, the brand introduced the Octane Fitness Zero Runner ZR7 home  exercise machine built to replicate walking, jogging or running and is constructed with independent hip and knee joints that allow users to customize their motion.
Commercial versions of the Octane Fitness Zero Runner machine, the ZR7000 and ZR8000 were introduced for use in fitness clubs and gyms.

The brand also makes the commercial grade Octane Fitness AirdyneX bike  and Octane Fitness Max Trainer MTX cardio machine.

Modern Movement
The Modern Movement brand has training products such as the M-Pad and  Edge-Board balance and core strength training boards, which help strengthen the core and improve balance. The M-Pad  balance board is collapsible and has three attachable base pads to increase the level of difficulty. The Edge-Board  core strength training board has curved rollers that allow user to make arcing turns and non-linear extensions.

References

External links
Nautilus, Inc. (home)

American companies established in 1986
Manufacturing companies established in 1986
Companies based in Vancouver, Washington
Companies listed on the New York Stock Exchange
Exercise equipment companies
Exercise-related trademarks